Murat Ismailovich Nasyrov (13 December 1969 – 19 January 2007) was a Russian pop singer of Uyghur ethnicity.

Controversy over his death 
He committed suicide by jumping from a balcony on January 19, 2007. The postmortem examination of his body did not reveal any traces of alcohol or drugs.

Nasyrov's supposed suicide has been disputed. Recent reports in the Russian press have implied that he may have been the victim of foul play, as family members and friends insist that Nasyrov was not depressed and had never considered suicide before. Some suspect that he was given an LSD tablet in a glass of wine at a club and after drinking it, he experienced hallucinations and leapt off his balcony.

Discography 
Step (1995; Single)
 The Boy Wants to go to Tambov (1997; Single)
Someone Will Forgive (1997)
My Story (1998)
All This Was Not Me (2000)
Wake Me Up (2002)
Kaldim Yalguz (2004)
Unpublished Album (2007)
Remixes (2010)

See also
Ablajan Awut Ayup
Erkin Abdulla

References

External links

Atush (Uyghur people song in arrangement of Murat Nasyrov)
Qaldim Yalghuz (Left alone). Uyghur text and music by Murat Nasyrov

1969 births
2007 suicides
Suicides by jumping in Russia
Russian people of Uyghur descent
20th-century Russian singers
20th-century Russian male singers
Winners of the Golden Gramophone Award